"Elm Grove", also known as Long's Landing, is a historic home and national historic district located at Southside, Mason County, West Virginia.  The district includes seven contributing buildings and one contributing structure.  The manor house is a High Victorian Italianate-style brick farmhouse built in 1884.  It features two round attic portholes and three porches.  Also on the property is a two-story contributing log house built in 1803, 1920s bungalow, late 19th century barn, a large sandstone fireplace shaped kiln, three outbuildings, and the site of the first brick manor house built c. 1830.

It was listed on the National Register of Historic Places in 1992.

References

Houses on the National Register of Historic Places in West Virginia
Historic districts in Mason County, West Virginia
Italianate architecture in West Virginia
Houses completed in 1803
Houses in Mason County, West Virginia
National Register of Historic Places in Mason County, West Virginia
Victorian architecture in West Virginia
Houses completed in 1884
Bungalow architecture in West Virginia
Historic districts on the National Register of Historic Places in West Virginia
Log buildings and structures on the National Register of Historic Places in West Virginia